This is a list of Maldivian films released in 2022.

Releases

Feature film

Television

See also
 List of Maldivian films of 2021
 Lists of Maldivian films
 List of Maldivian films of 2023

References 

Maldivian
2022